Nikolai Alexandrovich Antropov (born February 18, 1980) is a Kazakhstani-Canadian former professional ice hockey centre who played in the National Hockey League (NHL) with the Toronto Maple Leafs, New York Rangers, Atlanta Thrashers and Winnipeg Jets. He received Canadian citizenship in May 2007. Internationally Antropov played for Kazakhstan at several junior and senior tournaments, including the 2006 Winter Olympics.

Playing career
Antropov was expected to be drafted early in the second round, but following a dominant season with Torpedo Ust-Kamenogorsk in the second-tier of the Russian Superleague (RSL), including an international match against Iceland, in which he scored 11 goals and 26 points, he was drafted tenth overall by the Toronto Maple Leafs in the 1998 NHL Entry Draft. Before going overseas to play hockey in North America, Antropov also played in the RSL with Dynamo Moscow.

When Owen Nolan joined the Maple Leafs in March 2003, Antropov changed his number from #11 (Nolan's number for the San Jose Sharks) to #80, the year of his birth. In 2003–04, Maple Leafs head coach Pat Quinn placed Antropov alongside Joe Nieuwendyk and Alexei Ponikarovsky dubbed the "Skyline" due to the players' height.  
During the 2004–05 NHL lockout, Antropov returned to the RSL and played 36 games split between Ak Bars Kazan and Lokomotiv Yaroslavl. However, injuries felled the power forward, and he missed significant time during the 2005–06 season. Antropov managed to produce 12 goals and 19 assists for 31 points in 57 games.

Upon Antropov's return from injury, he added 15 points in the final 10 regular season games of the 2005–06 season. He finished third on the team in even strength scoring and also led the Leafs in plus-minus with a +13 rating. In 2006–07, Antropov typically played alongside team captain Mats Sundin and Ponikarovsky on Toronto's top line. On June 6, 2007, the Maple Leafs announced they had signed Antropov to a two-year contract extension. During a game against the New York Rangers on December 6, 2007, Antropov scored his second career hat-trick and was named the game's first star. In December 2007, a campaign was launched to encourage fans to vote Antropov as a write-in candidate for the 2007 NHL All-Star Game held in Atlanta.

On February 9, 2008, Antropov set a new career-high in goals with 19 when he scored in overtime to give the Maple Leafs a 3–2 win, tipping in an Anton Strålman slapshot; he finished the season with 26 goals. On March 4, 2009, Antropov was traded to the New York Rangers in exchange for a second-round draft pick and conditional draft pick.

On July 2, 2009, Antropov signed a four-year, $16.25 million deal with the Atlanta Thrashers as a free agent. He was expected to make $3.5 million the first year, $3.75 million the second, $4.25 million the third and $4.75 million for the final year of the deal for an average cap hit of $4.0625 million per year. Antropov's first year with the Thrashers was his most successful, scoring 24 goals and 43 assists. Following the team's relocation to Winnipeg in the summer of 2011, Antropov had scored the first goal of the new Winnipeg Jets on October 9, 2011, against the Montreal Canadiens.

On August 8, 2013, Antropov signed a two-year contract with Barys Astana of the Kontinental Hockey League (KHL), where he played during 2012–13 NHL lockout. At the conclusion of his two-year tenure with Barys, Antropov retired from professional hockey and returned to Canada.

International play

Internationally, Antropov represented Kazakhstan in the 1998 IIHF World Championship, the 1999 World Junior Ice Hockey Championships (scoring eight points in six games) and in the 2006 Winter Olympics, where he scored one goal. Antropov captained the Kazakhstani squad on both occasions. He and Colorado Avalanche goaltender Vitali Kolesnik were the lone NHL players on the team.

Personal life
During his tenure with the Leafs, Antropov became a Canadian citizen. He received Canadian citizenship in May 2007.

Antropov and his wife have three children. Antropov's oldest son, Danil was a forward for the Saginaw Spirit of the Ontario Hockey League during the 2019-20 season.

Career statistics

Regular season and playoffs

International

References

External links
 

1980 births
Living people
Ak Bars Kazan players
Atlanta Thrashers players
Asian Games gold medalists for Kazakhstan
Asian Games medalists in ice hockey
Barys Nur-Sultan players
Kazakhstani expatriate sportspeople in Russia
Kazakhstani expatriate sportspeople in Canada
Canadian ice hockey centres
Canadian people of Russian descent
HC Dynamo Moscow players
Ice hockey players at the 1999 Asian Winter Games
Ice hockey players at the 2006 Winter Olympics
Kazakhstani emigrants to Canada
Kazakhstani people of Russian descent
Kazakhstani expatriate ice hockey people
Kazzinc-Torpedo players
Lokomotiv Yaroslavl players
Medalists at the 1999 Asian Winter Games
National Hockey League first-round draft picks
Naturalized citizens of Canada
New York Rangers players
Olympic ice hockey players of Kazakhstan
Sportspeople from Oskemen
St. John's Maple Leafs players
Toronto Maple Leafs draft picks
Toronto Maple Leafs players
Winnipeg Jets players
Canadian expatriate ice hockey players in the United States
Canadian expatriate ice hockey players in Russia